Kokoona coriacea is a species of plant in the family Celastraceae. It is a tree found in Peninsular Malaysia and Borneo. It is threatened by habitat loss.

References

coriacea
Trees of Peninsular Malaysia
Trees of Borneo
Flora of Sarawak
Vulnerable plants
Taxonomy articles created by Polbot